Valentin Grigoryevich Olenik (18 July 1939 – 12 February 1987) was a Russian wrestler who competed in the 1964 Summer Olympics and in the 1968 Summer Olympics.

References

External links
 

1939 births
1987 deaths
Olympic wrestlers of the Soviet Union
Wrestlers at the 1964 Summer Olympics
Wrestlers at the 1968 Summer Olympics
Russian male sport wrestlers
Olympic silver medalists for the Soviet Union
Olympic medalists in wrestling
World Wrestling Championships medalists
Medalists at the 1968 Summer Olympics